Alexander Forbes Balkwill (15 December 1877 – 1947) was a Scottish footballer who played in the Football League for Derby County.

References

1877 births
1947 deaths
Scottish footballers
English Football League players
Association football forwards
Derby County F.C. players
Ripley Town F.C. players